"High School Dance" is a song recorded by American family group the Sylvers from their 1976 album Something Special.  Written by members of the Sylvers, it charted in 1977 at number 17 on the Pop charts and number 6 on the R&B charts.

Chart performance

Weekly singles charts

Year-end charts

References

External links
 

1976 songs
1977 singles
The Sylvers songs
Song recordings produced by Freddie Perren
Songs written by Leon Sylvers III
Capitol Records singles